The High Court of Greenland ( - ) is the central court of Greenland, located in the capital city, Nuuk. It exists alongside 18 other magistrates' courts and has supreme authority, handling most major cases.

The magistrates' courts hear lesser civil and criminal cases but under certain circumstances, the High Court may assume the hearing of a case if it is found to require special legal insight. If a decision made by a magistrates' court is controversial it may be appealed in the high court.

External links
The High Court of Greenland, official website

References

Nuuk
Courts in Greenland